Leki may refer to:

People
 Ananias Leki Dago (born 1970), Ivorian photographer
 Leki (singer) (born 1978), Congolese singer
 Leki Dukpa (born 1989), Bhutanese football player
 Leki Fotu (August 23, 1998), American American football player
 Leki Maka (born 1985), Tongan boxer

Places
 Azagi Leki or Aşağı Ləki, Azerbaijan
 Leki or Lyaki or Ləki, Azerbaijan
 Orta Ləki or Leki, Azerbaijan
 Yuxari Leki or Yuxarı Ləki, Azerbaijan
 Łęki (disambiguation), several places in Poland

Other
 Leki language, spoken in Iran and Turkey
 LeKi or Lempäälän Kisa, a Finnish ice hockey team